Broad Sound can refer to:

Broad Sound (Queensland), on the Australian coast
Broad Sound (Maine), near Portland, Maine, United States
Broad Sound (Massachusetts), near Boston, Massachusetts, United States